Melrose Township, Illinois may refer to one of the following townships:

 Melrose Township, Adams County, Illinois
 Melrose Township, Clark County, Illinois

See also

Melrose Township (disambiguation)

Illinois township disambiguation pages